The Voghji or Okchuchay is a river on the south slopes of the Lesser Caucasus range, and is a left tributary of Aras. It flows through the territory of Armenia and Azerbaijan.

In its upper reaches, it has formed a deep canyon which, near the city of Kapan, turns into a wide valley. It is fed by a range of sources.

The cities of Zangilan and Mincivan in Azerbaijan and Kajaran and Kapan in Armenia lie along the banks of the river.

Along the river, there are the Kapan and Voghji hydroelectric power stations.

See also
List of rivers of Armenia
List of lakes of Armenia
Rivers and lakes in Azerbaijan
Geography of Armenia
Geography of Azerbaijan

References 
 
 

Rivers of Azerbaijan
International rivers of Asia
International rivers of Europe
Rivers of the Republic of Artsakh
Rivers of Armenia